Stempfferia iturina is a butterfly in the family Lycaenidae. It is found in Cameroon, the Republic of the Congo, Gabon and the Democratic Republic of the Congo.

References

Butterflies described in 1921
Poritiinae